Yamaska in Abenaki language means "where the reeds grow"

Yamaska may refer to:

Places in Quebec
Yamaska, Quebec, a Quebec municipality in the Montérégie region 
Nicolet-Yamaska Regional County Municipality, Quebec
La Haute-Yamaska Regional County Municipality, Quebec
La Visitation-de-Yamaska, Quebec
Yamaska (electoral district)
Nicolet—Yamaska, former electoral district 
Yamaska (provincial electoral district)
Yamaska National Park
Yamaska River, a river in Quebec 
Mont Yamaska, part of the Monteregian Hills in southern Quebec

Arts
Yamaska (TV series), a Quebec popular television series